Philippe Horner is a Swiss paralympic archer. He won the bronze medal at the Men's individual compound - Open event at the 2008 Summer Paralympics in Beijing.

References

Swiss male archers
Living people
Paralympic bronze medalists for Switzerland
Paralympic archers of Switzerland
Archers at the 2008 Summer Paralympics
Medalists at the 2008 Summer Paralympics
Year of birth missing (living people)
Paralympic medalists in archery